Lee Min-ho (born June 22, 1987) is a South Korean actor, singer, model, creative director and businessman. He gained widespread fame worldwide with his role as Gu Jun-pyo in Boys Over Flowers (2009) which also earned him the Best New Actor award at the 45th Baeksang Arts Awards. His notable lead roles in television series include Personal Taste (2010), City Hunter (2011), Faith (2012), The Heirs (2013), The Legend of the Blue Sea (2016). In 2020 he starred in Studio Dragon's The King: Eternal Monarch, which grossed US$135 million. Apart from his television career, Lee featured in the first lead role in the film Gangnam Blues (2015). This was followed by his first China-produced film Bounty Hunters (2016), and the mini-romance-web-series Line Romance (2014), both collectively grossed US$51 million.

The success of Lee's television series established him as a top Hallyu star; he is the most followed South Korean actor on social media. Lee became the first Korean celebrity to have a wax figure made in his image at Madame Tussauds, with figures being unveiled in Shanghai in 2013, and Hong Kong in 2014. He earns US$2.5 million from product endorsements alone.

Early life and education
Lee Min-ho was born on June 22, 1987, in Heukseok-dong, Dongjak-gu, Seoul. Raised by Buddhist parents, he is the youngest of their two children. As a child, Lee initially hoped to become a professional football player. 

While attending Namseong Elementary School (서울남성초등학교), he was selected for the junior football class of manager and ex-professional player Cha Bum-kun. However, an injury during fifth grade put an end to his aspiration. Also beginning from when he was in Namseong, other pupils would joke and call Lee names. In a 2009 interview with the Asia Business Daily, he recalled his friends there nicknaming him kkamdungi in reference to his tan skin. Other nicknames were 'skeleton' from his time at Banpo Middle School (반포중학교) and 'demon' in high school—the former stemmed from the thought that he was "too skinny" whereas the latter nickname was what his "playful" personality earned him.

By his first year at Danggok High School (당곡고등학교), Lee had already turned his interests to acting and modeling. After he posed for a few magazines, he met the future president of Starhaus Entertainment coincidentally. The encounter would fuel his newly professional career as an actor, and he would ultimately sign with the agency in 2005.

In 2006, Lee enrolled at Konkuk University. In the university's College of Art and Design, he began majoring in Film Arts, for which he has since gotten a bachelor's degree. He is currently pursuing his master's degree in Film at Kookmin University Graduate School.

Career

2002–2008: Beginnings
Lee started auditioning and landed minor roles in several television shows such as Romance, Nonstop and Recipe of Love. His official debut (main) role was in an EBS series, Secret Campus (2006). Early in his career, Lee went by the stage name Lee Min because his agency thought his birth name was too ordinary. However, as his stage name was pronounced and written in the same way as the Korean word "imin", which means "immigration", he later said it was difficult to find himself in internet search results. He eventually went back to using his original name.

In 2006, his acting career was put on hold for a year following a serious car wreck, which occurred while riding in the back of a car with fellow actor Jung Il-woo. Their two friends riding in the front seat were killed instantly. Lee was severely injured and spent several months bedridden. Upon recovery, Lee received his first leading role in the high-school drama Mackerel Run in 2007, but the series was reduced to only eight episodes due to low viewership ratings. In 2008, he appeared in various roles on television (dramas Get Up and I Am Sam) and two movies, Public Enemy Returns and Our School's E.T.. During the shooting of the latter, he became good friends with actor Kim Su-ro. Kim later gave him praise on a variety show called Win Win: "I recognize a star when I see one. When I was doing Our School's E.T., I knew that Lee Min-ho would become one of the top actors in the country".

2009–2010: Breakthrough

Lee's breakthrough came in 2009 with the lead role of Gu Jun-pyo in KBS' Boys Over Flowers, the Korean adaptation of the popular Shōjo manga of the same name. Competition for the leading role was very intense and Lee only found out that he had been cast through the newspapers. The series attracted high viewership ratings and buzz throughout South Korea during its broadcast. Lee's new-found popularity gained him many endorsement deals and created another Korean wave throughout Asia which made Lee a Hallyu star.

In 2010, Lee starred in romantic comedy Personal Taste, in which he played a young architect who poses as a gay man to become roommates with a young woman, leading to romantic complications. When asked about why he chose the role during an interview, he responded "I think I would do a better job playing heavy and more defined roles when I am older. I think Personal Taste was perfect because it is bright, cheerful but you can also laugh and cry over it as well."

2011–2013: Global fame
In 2011, he played the titular character in action drama City Hunter, which was loosely based on Tsukasa Hojo's popular manga. The drama was a commercial success and contributed to Lee's growing popularity, most notably in Japan, Philippines, China, and in France. He participated in a popular Chinese variety show Happy Camp in December 2011.

In 2012, Lee starred in historical-medical drama, Faith with Kim Hee-sun. Although the drama garnered viewership ratings around the 10% range, it was a commercial failure due to its high budget. 

In April 2013, Lee's wax figure was unveiled at the Madame Tussauds Shanghai. He then released his first album "My Everything" in May 2013 and went on a fan meeting tour in Asia.

Lee also announced his return to television with a new drama titled The Heirs, a teen drama written by Kim Eun-sook. On why he decided to take on the role of a chaebol heir in high school four years after playing one in Boys Over Flowers, he answered "Before I grew past my 20s, I wanted to play a more upbeat character, one that would allow me to return to that feeling of simple, uncomplicated innocence that I had when I was younger." Premiering on October 9, 2013, The Heirs enjoyed immense popularity both locally, with a peak rating of 28.6%, and internationally, having over one billion hits on the Chinese streaming website iQiyi. Lee experienced an increase in his popularity globally.

2014–present: Continued success
In January 2014, a second wax figure of Lee was unveiled at Madame Tussauds Hong Kong. On January 30, Lee became the first Korean celebrity to perform on China's CCTV Lunar New Year Gala. He sang a song with Harlem Yu, the original singer of the theme song of Meteor Garden, the Taiwanese version of Boys Over Flowers. He was also invited to the third conference of the South Korean Presidential Committee for Cultural Enrichment as the representative for the entertainment industry, to share and contribute to the discussion of issues related to developing Korea's cultural content. Lee received the Prime Minister's Commendation at the 5th Korean Popular Culture and Arts Awards for his contribution to Hallyu.

Lee subsequently recorded and released his second EP Song for You in October 2014 under Universal Music. As with his previous album, he stated that the tracks were recorded for his fans and that he had no ambition to pursue a singing career. The album release coincided with the start of his RE:MINHO fan meeting tour which spanned various Asian cities.

He then took on a starring role in Yoo Ha's noir action film Gangnam Blues (2015), set in the 1970s when the real estate development boom swept across Gangnam area. The movie, which co-stars Kim Rae-won, marks Lee's first leading role in a feature film.

In 2016, Lee starred in the action comedy Bounty Hunters, directed by Shin Terra. The film topped box office charts on its release date and went on to gross US$31 million in China. Later in the year, Lee made his small-screen comeback in the fantasy romance drama The Legend of the Blue Sea alongside actress Jun Ji-hyun, which was a success.

In 2019, Lee was cast alongside Kim Go-eun in the SBS-broadcast and Netflix-distributed romantic-fantasy drama The King: Eternal Monarch written by The Heirs writer Kim Eun-sook. It was hailed as one of the most anticipated series of the first half of 2020, serving as Lee's comeback series following his release from mandatory military service. The series set a record for SBS's highest 2020 Friday-Saturday drama premiere ratings and maintaining the No.1 spot on the weekly Wavve drama chart for eight consecutive weeks, but received mixed reviews and lower-than-expected domestic TV viewership ratings on later episodes compared to previous works by Kim Eun-sook. The series was also listed as the most popular Korean drama series overseas on Netflix in India, Malaysia, Philippines and Singapore and one of the top two in the U.S.

Lee began in 2022 with a supporting role as Koh Hansu, a mysterious merchant, in the television series adaptation of Min Jin Lee's novel Pachinko. The series received positive reviews.

Public image and philanthropy

Ambassadorship

Philanthropy
In 2014, Lee set up the PROMIZ website, a fund-raising platform to raise awareness and encourage donation for social and humanitarian causes. Proceeds from the sale of PROMIZ merchandise are given to the selected partners to execute the charity projects. The site has raised US$50,000 from him and his fans to help create wells in Malawi through non-profit organization Charity: Water. It has also raised funds and contributed donations to causes such as Good Neighbours, World Water Day, the "Transparent Umbrella Project"  and the "Making Warm Winter for Both Bodies and Hearts" campaign. In 2016, PROMIZ won the Korea Good Brand Awards.

In 2015, Lee donated 100 million won to UNICEF to aid victims of a devastating earthquake in Nepal. In 2016, Lee was recognised by the Ministry of Health and Welfare for his contribution to society.

To mark the 10th anniversary of his debut, Lee's fans participated in several charitable events. Lee's Chinese fans planted 510 trees in Inner Mongolia, while his Mexican fans donated to children stricken with cancer with proceeds earned from selling plastic bottle caps to recycling companies. Taiwanese and Hong Kong fans also made donations to profit organizations World Vision and UNICEF. In previous years, his Chilean fan club donated to the humanitarian organization Patagonia Compassion and also participated in several other charitable causes.

Media influence
As of October 2020, Lee has over 3 million followers on Twitter, 23 million followers on Weibo and was the first Korean celebrity to garner 20 million followers on both Instagram and Facebook. In 2014 and 2015, Lee topped an online poll organized by a Chinese entertainment magazine and was voted as the "Asian Male God". In 2017, Lee was chosen as the "Most Favoured Korean Actor" by fans of the Korean wave in the United States. With a combined total of 65 million followers, he is referred to as the "King of social media".

YouTube channel
Lee Min-ho launched the YouTube channel "leeminho film" where he serves as executive producer and creative director.

Personal life
Lee has an elder sister, Yun-jeong, who is the co-founder and CEO of his current agency MYM Entertainment.

Despite his Buddhist upbringing, Lee is irreligious.

Car wreck
In 2006, Lee's acting career was put on hold for a year following a serious car wreck, which occurred while riding with fellow actor Jung Il-woo and two other friends. The group of friends were driving to Gangwon Province when a car crossing from the opposite lane after fleeing from a previous hit-and-run hit them head-on, destroying the hood and engine of their car. Lee and Jung, who were seated in the back of the car, survived the wreck in a critical state. Their friends, both sitting in the front of the car, died on the spot. Lee was severely injured and in a coma for a month, after which he spent several months bedridden. His injuries included broken ribs, thigh and ankle, along with a tear in his knee cartilage. As part of his treatment, a 46-centimeter metal pin was inserted in his thigh, leaving one of his legs shorter than the other.

Military enlistment
Lee Min-ho began his mandatory military service on May 12, 2018, at the Suseo Social Welfare Centre in Gangnam District Office as a public service officer. Lee was unable to serve as an active duty soldier due to a car crash in August 2006. He suffered another car wreck in 2011 while filming City Hunter.

On March 15, 2018, Lee entered his military training at the Korea Army Training Centre in Nonsan, South Chungcheong Province. He returned to his public service duty after four weeks of basic military training. He was discharged from South Korean Military service on April 25, 2019.

Filmography

Film

Television series

Web series

Music video

Discography

 My Everything (2013, Korean)
 My Everything (2013, Japanese)
 Song For You (2014)

Awards and nominations
 2022 Gold Derby TV Awards -BEST DRAMA ACTOR, BREAKTHROUGH PERFORMER OF THE YEAR

References

External links
 
  
 MYM entertainment (Agency) website   

1987 births
Living people
Former Buddhists
21st-century atheists
21st-century South Korean male actors
21st-century South Korean male singers
South Korean atheists
South Korean male film actors
South Korean male television actors
South Korean male web series actors
South Korean male models
South Korean male singers
Male actors from Seoul
Models from Seoul
People from Seoul
Singers from Seoul
People involved in road accidents or incidents
Konkuk University alumni
Best New Actor Paeksang Arts Award (television) winners